Gbagnon Badie (born 5 October 1992) is an Ivorian footballer who plays as a midfielder.

International career

International goals
Scores and results list the Ivory Coast's goal tally first.

References

External links 
 

1992 births
Living people
Ivorian footballers
Ivory Coast international footballers
ASEC Mimosas players
Association football midfielders
Academie de Foot Amadou Diallo players
2016 African Nations Championship players
Ivory Coast A' international footballers